Bragadiru is a town in the southwestern part of Ilfov County, Muntenia, Romania.

Demographics

According to the 2002 census, Bragadiru had a population of 8,165, of which 98.19% were Romanians, 1.45% were Romani, and 0.36% of other ethnic backgrounds.

References

Populated places in Ilfov County
Localities in Muntenia
Towns in Romania